The St. Louis Star-Times was a newspaper published in St. Louis. It was founded as The St. Louis Sunday Sayings in 1884. The newspaper ended in 1951 when it was purchased by the St. Louis Post Dispatch.

History 
The newspaper was founded by a printer and a reporter in 1884 as The St. Louis Sunday Sayings. As The Evening Star-Sayings, the newspaper emerged as a competitor to the St. Louis Post-Dispatch. The newspaper became the St. Louis Star in 1896, and the Star-Chronicle in 1905. It returned to the St. Louis Star in 1908; the New St. Louis Star in 1913; and then back to the St. Louis Star in 1914.

In June 1932 The Star purchased The American Press, publisher of The Times, to create The St. Louis Star and Times. The Times was Republican, while The Star considered itself nonpartisan. Circulation of The Times exceeded 100,000 from 1916 to 1918. From 1918 circulation of The Star surpassed The Times.

On June 15, 1951, the newspaper printed its last edition following its sale to Pulitzer Publishing Co., publisher of the Post-Dispatch. The newspaper had mounted steady losses, which publisher Elzey Roberts attributed to "ever-mounting labor and material costs."

References

External Links 

 St. Louis Star-Times Papers finding aid at the St. Louis Public Library

 
Newspapers published in St. Louis
Publications established in 1884
Companies based in St. Louis